Melanelixia ahtii is a species of foliose lichen in the family Parmeliaceae. Found in the United States, it was formally described as a new species in 2016 by Theodore Lee Esslinger, Ana Crespo, Helge Thorsten Lumbsch, Pradeep Kumar Divakar, and Steven Leavitt. The type specimen was collected from the north side of the Columbia River Gorge (Klickitat County, Washington). The species is known from DNA-verified collections in four western US states: California, Idaho, Oregon, and Washington. The species epithet ahtii honours Finnish lichenologist Teuvo Ahti, "for his contributions to understanding diversity in brown parmelioid lichens".

References

Parmeliaceae
Lichen species
Lichens described in 2016
Lichens of the Northwestern United States
Taxa named by Ana Crespo
Taxa named by Helge Thorsten Lumbsch
Taxa named by Pradeep Kumar Divakar
Fungi without expected TNC conservation status